The 1968 Delaware State Hornets football team represented Delaware State College—now known as Delaware State University—as a member of the Central Intercollegiate Athletic Association (CIAA) in the 1968 NCAA College Division football season. Led by second-year head coach Arnold Jeter and quarterback Norris Saunders, the Hornets compiled an overall record of 4–6 and a mark of 2–4 in conference play, placing 13th in the CIAA.

Schedule

References

Delaware State
Delaware State Hornets football seasons
Delaware State Hornets football